The metallic roughy (Hoplostethus metallicus) is a slimehead of the order Beryciformes. It is native to the Western Central Pacific along the eastern seaboard of Negros Island in the Philippines and other locations in the Sulu Sea. It is known from only 25 collected specimens, but members of this genus are known to frequently be "locally abundant," occurring in dense schools over seamounts.

References

Hoplostethus
Fish described in 1938
Fish of the Pacific Ocean
Fish of the Philippines